Bruce A. Wright is a retired United States Air Force lieutenant general who is the current president of the Air & Space Forces Association. He last served in active duty as commander of United States Forces Japan and 5th Air Force from February 2005 to April 2008.

After retiring, he worked at Lockheed Martin for nine years.

Dates of promotion 
Wright was promoted to the following ranks:

References 

Living people
1950s births
Recipients of the Legion of Merit
United States Air Force generals
United States Air Force Academy alumni